Statistics of Southern New England Soccer League in season 1916-17.

League standings
                         GP   W   L   T   GF  GA  PTS
 New Bedford F.C.         8   6   1   1   18  10  13
 Fall River Rovers        8   4   2   2   15  12  10
 J&P Coats               11   4   5   2   20  18  10
 Howard & Bullough FC     7   4   3   0   12  10   8
 New Bedford Celtics      8   3   3   2   15  14   8
 Crompton                11   2   6   3   13  20   7
 Pan Americans            6   3   3   0    9  10   6
 Fore River               5   1   4   0    8  16   0

References
Southern New England Soccer League (RSSSF)

1916-17
1916–17 domestic association football leagues
1916–17 in American soccer